Vel Soap or Vel Detergent (from the slogan "Mar-VEL-ous") is a soap liquid detergent by Colgate-Palmolive. Introduced in the United States in the late 1940s, the product was sold in places such as Argentina, Mexico, Puerto Rico, Venezuela and other Latin American countries as well as in Scandinavia. In Mexico, it was sold as Vel Rosita (Vel Pink). This was due to the liquid being pink as well as the bottles it was sold in.

In 2002, the brand was retired, but survives on the Danish market.

References

Products and services discontinued in 2002
Colgate-Palmolive brands
Cleaning product brands